Calosoma laeve is a species of ground beetle in the subfamily of Carabinae. It was described by Pierre François Marie Auguste Dejean in 1826.

References

laeve
Beetles described in 1826